The 1978 Louisville Cardinals football team was an American football team that represented the University of Louisville as an independent during the 1978 NCAA Division I-A football season. In their fourth season under head coach Vince Gibson, the Cardinals compiled a 7–4 record and outscored opponents by a total of 319 to 202.

The team's statistical leaders included Stu Stram with 929 passing yards, Nathan Poole with 1,394 rushing yards and 96 points scored, and Kenny Robinson with 534 receiving yards.

Schedule

References

Louisville
Louisville Cardinals football seasons
Louisville Cardinals football